The Enemy Within is the debut studio album by Sphere Lazza, released on September 12, 1995 by Cleopatra Records. The intended to follow their debut with a second album, tentatively titled Paradigm Shift, but the band's insterests were diverted elsewhere and the project never came to fruition.

Music
The track "Morphius" had previously been released on the 1994 various artists compilation The Art of Brutality by Arts Industria.

Reception 
Aiding & Abetting praised the gothic composition of The Enemy Within and said "Sphere Lazza write catchy songs with just the right amount of bouncy bass to keep things moving along." Industrialnation commended the band's new melodic musical direction and claimed the album "finally sees the realization of the sound Sphere Lazza had obviously been striving for in the past: a perfect balance between electronic aggression, and tuneful hooks.

Track listing

Personnel 
Adapted from the liner notes of ''The Enemy Within'.

Sphere Lazza
 Tony Spaz – instruments, production, recording (1, 2, 4-7, 9, 11, 12)
 David Trousdale – vocals, instruments, production, recording (1, 2, 4-7, 9, 11, 12)

Additional performers
 Alex Lafrantz – guitar (3, 11)

Production and design
 Ken Holewczynski (as Arts Industria) – cover art, illustrations, design
 Dana Cornock – remastering

Release history

References

External links 
 The Enemy Within at Discogs (list of releases)
 The Enemy Within at iTunes

1995 debut albums
Sphere Lazza albums
Cleopatra Records albums